The 2010 Americas Rugby Championship season was the second season of the Americas Rugby Championship. This was the only edition of the tournament in which Tonga A was featured.

Teams participating
 Argentina Jaguars

Table

Schedule

References

External links
 Official Website

2010
International rugby union competitions hosted by Canada
International rugby union competitions hosted by Argentina
2010 rugby union tournaments for clubs
2010 rugby union tournaments for national teams
2010 in Canadian rugby union
2010 in American rugby union
2010 in Argentine rugby union
2010 in Tongan rugby union
2010 in North American rugby union
2010 in South American rugby union
October 2010 sports events in South America